Terinaea atrofusca is a species of beetle in the family Cerambycidae. It was described by Bates in 1884. It is known from Japan.

The Latin specific epithet atrofusca refers to dark-swarthy, dark-brown coloured, atro-fuscus.

References

Desmiphorini
Beetles described in 1884